Ropa may refer to:

 Ropa (river), a river in southern Poland
 Ropa, Croatia, a village on the Adriatic island of Mljet
 Ropa, Lesser Poland Voivodeship, a village in Poland
 Gmina Ropa, a municipality in Poland

See also
 ROPA (disambiguation)